During the second half of 2009 there were nearly 100 magazine titles in Bulgaria. There are also editions of international magazines such as Glamour and Grazia in addition to national magazines. The Bulgarian edition of Grazia, an Italian magazine, is the first international spin-off of the magazine.

The following is an incomplete list of current and defunct magazines published in Bulgaria. They may be published in Bulgarian or in other languages.

B
 Bliasak

C
 Cosmopolitan Bulgaria

D
 Da znaem poveche

E
 Egoist

F
 Fakel

G
 Glamour Bulgaria

L
 LIK
 Literary Club

M
 Moeto dete

N
 Nash Dom

O
 Odysseus

P
 PC Mania
 Praven Svyat

R
 Regal

S
 Starshel

T
 Tema

V
 Vagabond

See also
 List of newspapers in Bulgaria

References

Bulgaria
Magazines